Dream Unlimited Corporation is a Canadian real estate development company that is developing the Waterfront Toronto property on Lake Ontario. It has $15b of real estate assets.

Corporation 
Dream Unlimited was founded in 1994. As of December 2022, Dream Unlimited employed 551 staff. In January 2023, Toronto's former deputy mayor Ana Bailão joined Dream Unlimited as the head of affordable housing and public affairs. In January 2022, the company launched the Dream Community Foundation, not-for-profit organization.

Finances 
In 2021, Dream Unlimited had $15 billion of assets under management, $9 billion of which are fee earning. It owned 11.2 million square feet of commercial rentable real estate, including 26,018 residential rental units.

By 2021, it has completed construction of $38 billion of commercial real estate and renewable energy infrastructure.

Real estate projects 
In 2019, Dream Unlimited proposed three designs to the City of Toronto to develop a downtown Toronto multi-storey property at 49 Ontario Street.

In December 2022, Dream Unlimited was approved by Waterfront Toronto to develop 12 acres of lakeside Toronto that Google subsidiary Sidewalk Labs abandoned plans to develop in 2020. Dream Unlimited will develop the land with Great Gulf Group, both companies will operate as Quayside Impact Limited Partnership. The project plans to incorporate 800 affordable residences.

Along with Diamond Corporation, FRAM + Slokker, and the Kilmer Group, Dream Unlimited are developing a 72 acre housing development in  Mississauga known as Brightwater community.

References

External links 

 Official website

Real estate companies of Canada
Companies based in Toronto